The 1977 All-Ireland Senior Football Championship was the 91st staging of the All-Ireland Senior Football Championship, the Gaelic Athletic Association's premier inter-county Gaelic football tournament. The championship began on 8 May 1977 and ended on 25 September 1977.

Kilkenny returned to the Leinster Senior Football Championship.

Dublin entered the championship as the defending champions.

On 25 September 1977, Dublin won the championship following a 5-12 to 3-6 defeat of Armagh in the All-Ireland final. This was their 20th All-Ireland title and their second championship in succession.

Dublin's Jimmy Keaveney was the championship's top scorer with 2-27. Keaveney was also the choice for Texaco Footballer of the Year.

Results

Connacht Senior Football Championship

Quarter-finals

Semi-finals

Final

Leinster Senior Football Championship

Preliminary round

Quarter-finals

Semi-finals

Final

Munster Senior Football Championship

Quarter-finals

Semi-finals

  
Final

Ulster Senior Football Championship

Preliminary round

Quarter-finals

Semi-finals

Final

All-Ireland Senior Football Championship

Semi-finals

Final

Championship statistics

Top scorers

Overall

Single game

Miscellaneous

 After 2 years in the Connacht championship London record against Leitrim was their first ever championship win.
 Armagh qualify for the Ulster final for the first time since 1961. Their defeat of Derry in that game secures their first provincial title since 1953.
 The All-Ireland semi-final draw between Armagh and Roscommon was the first at that stage of the competition since 1969 when Cavan and Offaly drew.
 The attendance of 54,974 at the All-Ireland semi-final between Dublin and Kerry was the largest at an All-Ireland semi-final since 1962 when 60,396 watched the same teams in action.
 Jimmy Keaveney of Dublin set a new scoring record in an All-Ireland final when he scores 2-6 for Dublin against Armagh.

References

External links
 Haughey, Jimmy. "My Greatest Game: Former Armagh captain Jimmy Smyth relives 1977 Ulster Final". BBC Sport. 16 May 2020.

All-Ireland Senior Football Championship